The Cambrian Chickies Formation is a mapped bedrock unit in Pennsylvania, New Jersey, and Maryland. It is named for Chickies Rock, north of Columbia, Pennsylvania along the Susquehanna River.

Description 
The Chickies Formation is described as a light-gray to white, hard, massive quartzite and quartz schist with thin interbedded dark slate at the top. Included at the base is the Hellam Conglomerate Member. It is a rare metamorphic rock that has fossils; Skolithos is found throughout the formation.

Depositional age 
Relative age dating places the Chickies in the Lower Cambrian Period, deposited between 542 and 520 million years ago (±2 million years).

Economic geology 
The Chickies is quarried as a building stone and for aggregate. The stone used to build the restrooms at Valley Forge National Historical Park is Chickies quartzite.

See also 
 Geology of Pennsylvania

References 

Geologic formations of New Jersey
Cambrian System of North America
Cambrian Maryland
Cambrian geology of Pennsylvania
Quartzite formations